Bradmore is a civil parish in the Rushcliffe district of Nottinghamshire, England. The parish contains 19 listed buildings that are recorded in the National Heritage List for England. All the listed buildings are designated at Grade II, the lowest of the three grades, which is applied to "buildings of national importance and special interest".  The parish contains the village of Bradmore and the surrounding area, and all the listed buildings are in the village. The village buildings were largely destroyed by a fire in 1705, including the body of the church, but its tower and spire survived and are listed. Following the fire, Sir Thomas Parkyns of Bunny Hall, designed new buildings for the village, many of which are listed, and these include houses, farmhouses and farm buildings. The other listed buildings include a chapel and a telephone kiosk.


Buildings

References

Citations

Sources

 

Lists of listed buildings in Nottinghamshire